George Gund is the name of:

George Frederick Gund, American banker and brewery owner in the 19th century
George Gund III (1937–2013), owner of the Minnesota North Stars, Cleveland Barons, San Jose Sharks, and Cleveland Cavaliers
George Gund II (1888–1966), American banker, art collector, and philanthropist
The George Gund Foundation, a major philanthropic organization based in Cleveland, Ohio